Bangla O Bangali (Bengali: বাংলা ও বাঙালী; English: "Bengal and Bengalees" ) is a Bengali language historical book written by Prabhat Ranjan Sarkar. It was first published in 1988. In this text he has searched for many unknown facts. It sheds light on the identity, homeland, culture, language etc. of the Bengali people.

See also 
 Bengalis
 কংসনারায়ণ (article on Bengali wikipedia)

References

External links 

 Bangla O Bangali

1988 books
Prabhat Ranjan Sarkar
Indian books